Chotel Czerwony  is a village in the administrative district of Gmina Wiślica, within Busko County, Świętokrzyskie Voivodeship, in south-central Poland.

It is notable for its Gothic church of St. Bartholomew funded by Jan Długosz and built in the mid 15th century.

See also
 The Lesser Polish Way

References

Villages in Busko County
Kielce Governorate
Kielce Voivodeship (1919–1939)